The 2003 Saskatchewan Scott Tournament of Hearts women's provincial curling championship, was held January 22–26 at the Balgonie Stardome in Balgonie, Saskatchewan. The winning team of Jan Betker, represented Saskatchewan at the 2003 Scott Tournament of Hearts in Kitchener, Ontario, where the team finished round robin with a 7-4 record, losing the 3-4 game to Newfoundland's Cathy Cunningham.

Teams

 Sue Altman
 Sherry Anderson
 Lorraine Arguin
 Jan Betker
 Nancy Inglis
 Stefanie Miller
 Patty Rocheleau
 Chantelle Seiferling

Standings

Results

Draw 1
January 22, 3:00 PM CT

Draw 2
January 22, 8:00 PM CT

Draw 3
January 23, 9:30 AM CT

Draw 4
January 23, 2:00 PM CT

Draw 5
January 24, 2:00 PM CT

Draw 6
January 24, 7:00 PM CT

Draw 7
January 25, 9:30 AM CT

Playoffs

Semifinal
January 25, 7:00 PM CT

Final
January 26, 2:00 PM CT

References

Saskatchewan Scotties Tournament Of Hearts, 2003
2003 in Saskatchewan
Curling in Saskatchewan